Gimsøy Church is a parish church of the Church of Norway in Skien Municipality in Vestfold og Telemark county, Norway. It is located in the Gimsøy area of the town of Skien. It is one of the churches for the Gimsøy og Nenset parish which is part of the Skien prosti (deanery) in the Diocese of Agder og Telemark. The gray, stone church was built in a long church design in 1922 using plans drawn up by the architect Gunnar Norby. The church seats about 200 people.

History
Gimsøy Abbey was a large farm owner and powerful entity in the Skien area during the Middle Ages. It was located on the island of Gimsøy which was located in the Farelva river (now the island is known as Klosterøya, meaning "Abbey Island"). The Abbey was closed after the Reformation and then it burned down in 1546, with no trace of it left today. After the town of Skien was enlarged in 1916, it became important for this area to have its own chapel and cemetery. The new Gimsøy Chapel was designed by Gunnar Nordby and it was consecrated on 10 December 1922. The new chapel was built as a long church out of plastered stone. The choir has an apse on its east end and it's surrounded by a sacristy. The church was restored in 1972, when windows with stained glass were inserted in the choir wall.

Media gallery

See also
List of churches in Agder og Telemark

References

Buildings and structures in Skien
Churches in Vestfold og Telemark
Long churches in Norway
Stone churches in Norway
20th-century Church of Norway church buildings
Churches completed in 1922
1922 establishments in Norway